Schifflache is a small river of Hesse, Germany. It flows into the Main south of Hanau.

See also
List of rivers of Hesse

Rivers of Hesse
Bogs of Hesse
Rivers of Germany